Samuel Falson (born 8 November 1982), better known by his stage name Sam Sparro, is an Australian singer, songwriter and record producer. He was signed to the British record label Island Records. Sparro is best known for his 2008 single "Black and Gold".

Biography
Sam Sparro was born 8 November 1982 and raised in Sydney, Australia. Sparro's father, Chris Falson is a gospel minister and recording artist of Maltese descent who has written music for Star Trek and Queer Eye for the Straight Guy. Sparro's mother, Karyn Falson (née Frankland) is from Australia. His brother plays guitar professionally while his mother plays organ at a Baptist church. The family relocated to Los Angeles when Sparro was ten years old. His father had signed a deal there and was recording a soul album, he took Sparro to a church in Tujunga to hear some of the genre's singers. Fellow church goers, were the McCrary family. Chaka Khan became one of his early admirers after hearing Sparro's singing through knowing the McCrarys. His first role as a child actor was in a McDonald's commercial. His stage name was derived from a family nickname, which in turn was inspired by the Sydney radio announcer Gary O'Callaghan's on-air character "Sammy Sparrow".

Sparro left Los Angeles and returned to Sydney, where he lived with his grandparents and worked for a public relations company, before travelling to the UK, immersing himself in the music scene in London. He returned to Los Angeles in 2002, where he took a job in a coffee shop. It was during this time that he wrote his single, "Black and Gold" with his producer, Jesse Rogg. When growing up, Sparro regularly performed backing vocals at his father's concerts and on his music releases. He states "I'm a spiritual person, but ... not into any religion. I was always kind of a non-denominational Christian" and "a bit of a gypsy". Sparro is openly gay. He did an interview for Attitude magazine and was featured on the front cover. Sparro married DJ Zion Lennox in a private ceremony in California on 21 September 2018.

Career
Sparro's debut single, "Cottonmouth", was released in late 2007. His second single, "Black and Gold", peaked at number two in the United Kingdom in April 2008 and at number four in Australia, and has since been used in soundtracks and promotional campaigns for various television series, video games, and films. Sparro's self-titled debut album, Sam Sparro, was released in the UK in April 2008 and reached the top five on the UK Albums Chart, eventually receiving a gold certification from the BPI for selling 100,000 copies. Two subsequent singles, "21st Century Life" and "Pocket", were considerably less successful on the charts.

During promotion of "Black and Gold", Sparro covered "American Boy" by Estelle on Jo Whiley's Live Lounge on BBC Radio 1. In September 2008, Sparro was nominated for five ARIA Music Awards. His tour that month formed part of the Wonky Pop tour; Wonky Pop is a new genre of music created by artists such as Sparro and Alphabeat. In December 2008, Sparro and co-writer/ producer Jesse Rogg received a Grammy Award nomination for Best Dance Recording for "Black and Gold".

Sparro is featured on the Basement Jaxx single "Feelings Gone", released in September 2009. He also collaborated on a track called "Soles on Fire" with Chauffeur, which consists of Sparro, Theophilus London and producer Mark Ronson. In March 2010, a new single, "Corrected" was released to U.S. iTunes and is a collaboration with Mason (DJ) and rapper DMC. Sparro co-wrote Voodoo with Adam Lambert, a song that appears on the international and tour editions of Lambert's album For Your Entertainment and digital ep Remixes.In July 2010, a new song titled "Pink Cloud" was premiered on East Village Radio's Accidental Rhythm. The premiered song was stated to be un-mastered. The video for the song, directed by artist and designer Franc Fernandez, was uploaded onto Sparro's YouTube channel in December 2010. Sparro stated via his Twitter that the video is an art project, and the song was not released as a single. Addressing rumours of a mostly instrumental album, he clarified that, unlike "Pink Cloud", his second album would be full of tracks featuring his vocals. A free EP was released following the release of the video.

Sparro announced his second album, Return to Paradise, on his newly redesigned website. It was described as being inspired by soul and funk from the late seventies and early eighties. A new video premiered, featuring a new track from the album. In January 2012, "The Shallow End" was uploaded onto VEVO and YouTube. It is "compiled of home video footage of the making of the record and was filmed in LA, New York, London and Spain." The album will be out in Spring 2012, accompanied by tours in the United States and Australia. A video was filmed for the upcoming track, "Happiness". Sam collaborated with Adam Lambert again for Lambert's second album Trespassing,  co-writing Shady and Broken English with Lambert and Lester Mendez.  Sam and Adam performed Shady together with Nile Rodgers at the We are Family gala on 31 January 2013.

In late 2013, Sparro released his first mixtape Mechanical to SoundCloud, featuring sixteen songs. On 17 September 2013, Sparro collaborated with The Bloody Beetroots on a track titled "Glow in the Dark" stating that "It's one of my favorite songs I've written recently." On 1 October 2013, Sparro's new EP, Quantum Physical, was released, in which the lead single being "Hang on To Your Love" featuring Durand Bernarr Hang on To Your Love, Fascism, and Infinite were included from Mechanical. He is currently working on and directing the music video for "Hang on To Your Love".

On 14 February 2014 "Stay in Love", Sparro's fourth single as a featured artist was released with producer, instrumentalist, and lifelong friend Plastic Plates to the producer's SoundCloud account. The release was appropriately timed as Sparro posted a link to the track on his Facebook and Twitter accounts with the words "Happy Valentines Day Lovers". The song was made available for digital purchase on 19 February, contrary to the official release date of 13 February listed everywhere.

Sparro's mixtape Love Made Me Do It was released to his SoundCloud account on 13 February 2015. 31 July of that year he released the single "Hands Up" from the second volume of Quantum Physical, with a remix single following on 25 September. Quantum Physical, Vol. 2 was released on 16 October 2015 with Intuit Records.

Discography 

 Sam Sparro (2008)
 Return to Paradise (2012)
 Boombox Eternal (2020)

Awards and nominations 
ARIA Music Awards

|-
| rowspan=6 | 2008 || Sam Sparro || Best Male Artist || 
|-
| Sam Sparro || Breakthrough Artist – Album ||  
|-
| rowspan=4 | "Black and Gold" || Breakthrough Artist – Single || 
|-
| Best Pop Release || 
|-
| Single of the Year || 

GLAAD Media Awards

|-
| 2009 || Sam Sparro || Outstanding Music Artist || 

Grammy Awards

|-
|  || "Black and Gold" || Best Dance Recording || 

GQ Australia Man of the Year Awards

|-
| 2012 || Sam Sparro || Man of Style || 

MTV Australia Awards

|-
| 2009 || "Black and Gold" || Best Dance Video ||

References

External links

Australian website 
Interview with The Advocate magazine on Grammy Award nomination
Eleanor Conway Presents: Sam Sparro video interview
Wonky Pop website

1982 births
Living people
Australian dance musicians
Australian people of Maltese descent
Electro musicians
Australian gay musicians
Neo soul singers
LGBT Christians
Australian LGBT singers
Australian LGBT songwriters
Gay songwriters
Musicians from Sydney
Wonky pop musicians
Gay singers
Nu-disco musicians